The Ngezi River (formerly Ingezi River) is a river in southeastern Zimbabwe. It is a tributary of the Runde River. It has an elevation of 973m.

References

Rivers of Zimbabwe
Save River (Africa)